Hoszów is a village in the administrative district of Gmina Ustrzyki Dolne, within Bieszczady County, Subcarpathian Voivodeship, in south-eastern Poland.

On 8 August 1769 in a battle against Russian troops during the Bar Confederation, Franciszek Pułaski, cousin of general Kazimierz Pułaski, was heavily injured and died afterwards in Lesko.

References

Villages in Bieszczady County